Giovanni Odazzi (1663 – 6 June 1731) was an Italian painter and etcher of the Baroque period, active mainly in Rome.

Biography

He was a pupil of Ciro Ferri, then worked under the guidance of Giovanni Battista Gaulli. He also worked with Cornelis Bloemaert. Among his many works in Rome, he painted a Prophet Hosea for San Giovanni in Laterano and a Fall of Lucifer and rebel angels for the basilica of the Santi Apostoli, Rome. He frescoed the cupola of the cathedral of San Bruno in Velletri. He painted an Adoration of the Magi and Flight to Egypt for the church of Santa Maria in Aracoeli in Rome. He also painted altarpieces for Santa Maria degli Angeli, a Dream of Joseph for Santa Maria della Scala, San Clemente, a San Ciriaco for Santa Maria in Via Lata and San Giovanni in Laterano. He was knighted into the Academy of St Luke by Pope Clement XI.

Works

Annunciation
Temptation of St. Anthony, oil on canvas, 71.c x 95.1 cm
Prophet Hosea (1718), San Giovanni in Laterano
Fall of Lucifer and Rebel Angels, Santi Apostoli, Rome
Adoration of the Magi, Flight to Egypt and King David, Santa Maria in Aracoeli, Rome
Dream of Joseph, Santa Maria della ScalaApparition of the Virgin at St. Bruno (around 1700), altarpiece at Santa Maria degli AngeliSan Ciriaco, Santa Maria in Via LataVision of St. Bernard (1705), San Bernardo alle TermeSt. Andrew in Glory, Sant'Andrea al QuirinaleMartyr of St. Barbara, St. Barbara (Santa Barbara) chapel, Rieti Cathedral (with Antonio Concioli)

References

Italycyberguide entry

External links

1663 births
1731 deaths
17th-century Italian painters
Italian male painters
18th-century Italian painters
Italian Baroque painters
Baroque engravers
18th-century Italian male artists